Comet is an unincorporated community in Little River County, Arkansas, United States.

References

Unincorporated communities in Little River County, Arkansas
Unincorporated communities in Arkansas